Hydrophis sibauensis, also known as the Kalimantan sea snake, is a species of venomous sea snake in the family Elapidae that is native to Indonesia, and endemic to Borneo. The specific epithet sibauensis refers to the Sibau River.

Behaviour
The species is viviparous.

Distribution and habitat
The range of the snake is limited to the Sibau River, a tributary of the Kapuas River, in West Kalimantan, Borneo, in fresh water some 1,000 km upriver from the sea. The type locality is Putussibau.

References

 
sibauensis
Snakes of Southeast Asia
Reptiles of Indonesia
Endemic fauna of Borneo
Reptiles described in 2001
Reptiles of Borneo